James Joseph Rowley (October 14, 1908 – November 1, 1992) was the head of the United States Secret Service between 1961 and 1973, under Presidents Kennedy, Johnson, and Nixon.

Rowley was born in Bronx County, New York to James J. Rowley and Bridget Theresa McTeague. His parents were Irish immigrants who met in New York City and were married in Manhattan.

Rowley began working for the Secret Service in 1938 during the days of Franklin D. Roosevelt's administration, after first joining the FBI in 1936. On June 18, 1964, Rowley provided testimony to the Warren Commission investigating the assassination of John F. Kennedy. After the assassination, Secret Service training was regularized and systematized. The James J. Rowley Training Center in Beltsville, Maryland is named after him.                                Rowley died of congestive heart failure at his home in Leisure World, Maryland.

References

External links
 Transcript of interview with Rowley from the Truman Library

1908 births
1992 deaths
American people of Irish descent
Directors of the United States Secret Service
People from the Bronx
United States Secret Service agents
People from Montgomery County, Maryland